Joan Emily Sparkes ( Southgate; born 25 July 1916) was an English international lawn bowls competitor.

Bowls career
Joan Emily Southgate was born in [Brightlingsea]], Essex on 25 July 1916. In 1938, she married Leslie A. Sparkes (a county player and butcher by trade). She was introduced to the sport by her husband and took up bowls in 1954 at Burnham-on-Crouch. She won the 1966 & 1972 triples title at the England Women's National Championships when bowling for Essex.

In 1973 she won the silver medal in the fours at the 1973 World Outdoor Bowls Championship in Wellington, New Zealand and also earned a bronze medal in the team event (Taylor Trophy). Four years later she won another silver medal in the fours at the 1977 World Outdoor Bowls Championship in Worthing with Margaret Lockwood, Joan Hunt and Mabel Darlington.

References

1916 births
Possibly living people
English female bowls players